Paul Dennett is a Labour Party politician who is the current elected Mayor of Salford and the Deputy Mayor of Greater Manchester.

Early life 
Dennett was born in Warrington and grew up working class. His father worked for a power station and was an active trade unionist and his mother was a housewife and house cleaner. His parents would later run The Engine Pub in Prescot, Merseyside. He attended Park Road Primary School and Great Sankey High School, before working in customer services at a BT call centre.

He received a BA in International Business from the University of Ulster, an MSc in Human Resource Management and Industrial Relations from the Manchester Business School, and an MRES in Social Sciences from Manchester Metropolitan University. While at university, Dennett worked as an HR adviser and as a lecturer at Manchester Metropolitan University Business School.

Career 
Dennett joined the Labour Party in 2007. He was elected the Mayor of Salford on 5 May 2016, succeeding Ian Stewart also of the Labour Party, and was re-elected in 2021.

As the Mayor of Salford he is also a member of the Greater Manchester Combined Authority, is the GMCA's portfolio lead for housing, homelessness and infrastructure, and, is the Deputy Mayor of Greater Manchester.

Dennett was formerly a local councillor for the Langworthy ward in Salford, and is a member of the Unite and UCU trade unions.

References

Year of birth missing (living people)
Gay politicians
Labour Party (UK) mayors
Living people
LGBT mayors of places in the United Kingdom
English LGBT politicians
Mayors of Salford
People from Warrington
Members of the Greater Manchester Combined Authority